Arnaud Giovaninetti (3 July 1967 – 25 January 2018) was a French actor.

His father Reynald was a composer. He was married to actress Judith d'Aleazzo. In 1988, Giovaninetti was awarded the Louis Jouvet Prize. He died at the age of 50 on 25 January 2018.

Selected filmography
The Lover (1992)
La Rivière Espérance (1995)
Children of the Century (1999)
Lovely Rita, sainte patronne des cas désespérés (2003)
Dalida (2005)
Lettres de la mer rouge (2006)
Candice Renoir (2013-2018)

References

1967 births
2018 deaths
People from Amiens
21st-century French male actors
20th-century French male actors
French male television actors
French male film actors